The Complete Works of Voltaire (Œuvres complètes de Voltaire) is the first critical edition of the totality of Voltaire's writings (in the original French) arranged chronologically. The project was started by the bibliographer and translator Theodore Besterman who only lived to see the first two volumes published. It is currently published by the Voltaire Foundation at the University of Oxford.

Each text is given an introduction, variants and detailed annotations. The first volume was published in 1968, with the 205th and final volume appearing in April 2022.

Reviews

See also

References

External links 
 Complete Works of Voltaire homepage 
 Tout Voltaire, The ARTFL Project, University of Chicago

Works about Voltaire
18th-century French literature
Works by Voltaire